Collection is an album by Jason Becker released by Shrapnel Records on November 4, 2008. The album includes three new songs in addition to some older recordings. It includes many musicians and features guitarists such as Marty Friedman, Greg Howe, Joe Satriani, Michael Lee Firkins, Steve Vai, and Steve Hunter.

Collection
This album contains a mixture of remastered songs from Becker's previous projects, as well as three new songs. Even though he can no longer move and speak, he was still able to compose for the album. He explained his method in an HTML file included on the album disc.

"I used a music software program called LogicPro with a Mac computer and a synthesizer keyboard hooked up to it. My father had invented a very fast and effective communication system for me when I was losing my voice. It is a sign language that requires only eye movements and is faster than any computer. I would try to explain to my caregiver (usually my dad, mom, or my close friends) what to play on the keyboard. When they got fairly close, I would have them take me into LogicPro where I could edit every part of every note. After composing in this way I got together with my friend and co-producer, Dan Alvarez. We worked on arrangements and sounds to make it better. Then we got musician friends to add their talents to the mix."

In addition to 13 tracks, the disc also includes bonus features that are playable on a computer. These features include demo versions of Becker's piece End of the Beginning recorded while he could still barely play, as well as a demo of Go Off! from Cacophony and a recording of Becker "noodling" on guitar.

Track listing

Musicians

 Jason Becker - Guitar, Producer, Mixing
 Dan Alvarez - Organ, Piano, Arranger, Keyboards, Choir, Chorus, Synclavier, Drum Programming, Keyboard Arrangements
 Caren Anderson - Soprano
 Atma Anur - Drums
 Jennie Bemesderfer - Alto
 Mike Bemesderfer - Flute, Throat Singing
 Gregg Bissonette - Percussion, Drums
 Matt Bissonette - Bass, Vocals
 Joey Blake - Vocals
 Deen Castronovo - Drums
 Bryan Dyer - Choir, Chorus
 Cathy Ellis - Soprano
 Michael Lee Firkins - Dobro, Guitar
 Marty Friedman - Guitar
 Steve Hunter - Guitar
 Danny Griffin - Throat Singing
 Greg Howe - Guitar
 Raz Kennedy - Vocals
 Marc LaFrance - Vocals 
 Alison Lewis - Choir, Chorus
 Dave Lopez - Guitar
 Salar Nader - Tabla, Dhol
 DJ D Sharp - Beats
 Jimmy O'Shea - Bass
 Melanie Rath - Vocals
 Steve Rosenthal - Cymbals
 David Lee Roth - Vocals
 Joe Satriani - Guitar
 Anisha Thomas - Soprano
 Brett Tuggle - Keyboards, Vocals
 Steve Vai - Guitar

Production
 Mike Varney - Executive producer
 Ashley Moore - Mastering
 Jason Becker - Producer, Mixing
 Dan Alvarez - Producer, Mixing
 Mike Bemesderfer - Producer, Editing, Mixing
 Matt Bissonette - Bass, Vocals, Producer
 Steve Fontano - Producer
 Marty Friedman - Producer
 Greg Howe - Producer
 John Lowry - Engineer
 Bob Rock - Producer, Mixing

Personnel
 Gary Becker - Cover Painting
 Mark Leialoha - Photography
 Tony Masterantonio - Graphic Design
 Ross Pelton - Photography
 Dave Stephens - Graphic Design

References

2008 albums
Jason Becker albums
Shrapnel Records albums
Albums produced by Mike Varney